The 1984 IAAF World Cross Country Championships was held in East Rutherford, New Jersey, United States, at the Meadowlands Racetrack on March 25, 1984.   A report on the event was given in the Glasgow Herald.

Complete results for men, junior men, women, medallists, 
 and the results of British athletes were published.

Medallists

Race results

Senior men's race (12.086 km)

Note: Athletes in parentheses did not score for the team result

Junior men's race (8 km)

Note: Athletes in parentheses did not score for the team result

Senior women's race (5 km)

Note: Athletes in parentheses did not score for the team result

Medal table (unofficial)

Note: Totals include both individual and team medals, with medals in the team competition counting as one medal.

Participation
An unofficial count yields the participation of 443 athletes from 40 countries.  This is in agreement with the official numbers as published.

 (1)
 (21)
 (19)
 (6)
 (6)
 (16)
 (5)
 (21)
 (13)
 (8)
 (21)
 (9)
 (2)
 (6)
 (18)
 (1)
 (21)
 (8)
 (5)
 (10)
 (7)
 (9)
 (7)
 (14)
 (16)
 (6)
 (2)
 (20)
 (11)
 (5)
 (21)
 (8)
 (21)
 (13)
 (8)
 (21)
 (4)
 (2)
 (21)
 (10)

See also
 1984 IAAF World Cross Country Championships – Senior men's race
 1984 IAAF World Cross Country Championships – Junior men's race
 1984 IAAF World Cross Country Championships – Senior women's race
 1984 in athletics (track and field)

References

External links
The World Cross Country Championships 1973-2005
GBRathletics
Athletics Australia

Australia]
 

 
World Athletics Cross Country Championships
IAAF World Cross Country Championships
C
Sports competitions in New Jersey
IAAF World Cross Country
International track and field competitions hosted by the United States
Cross country running in the United States
Track and field in New Jersey
IAAF World Cross Country Championships